Yelena Viktorovna Dmitriyeva, née Chaplina (born 1 July 1983 in Astrakhan) is a Russian team handball player, playing on the Russian women's national handball team. She won gold medal with the Russian winning team in the 2007 World Women's Handball Championship.

References

External links

1983 births
Living people
Sportspeople from Astrakhan
Russian female handball players
Handball players at the 2008 Summer Olympics
Olympic handball players of Russia
Olympic silver medalists for Russia
Olympic medalists in handball
Medalists at the 2008 Summer Olympics